Bécordel-Bécourt (before 1900: Bécourt-Bécordel) is a commune in the Somme department in Hauts-de-France in northern France.

Geography

History
The village of Bécourt was destroyed in the First World War, see Battle of Albert (1914).

Population

See also
Communes of the Somme department

References

Communes of Somme (department)